Phacoides is a genus of bivalves belonging to the family Lucinidae.  

The genus has cosmopolitan distribution.

Species

 Phacoides albella 
 Phacoides cancellatus : synonym of Codakia cubana Dall, 1901: synonym of Ferrocina cubana (Dall, 1901) (nomen dubium)
 Phacoides inornata 
 † Phacoides lepis 
 Phacoides pectinatus

References

 Taylor J. & Glover E. (2021). Biology, evolution and generic review of the chemosymbiotic bivalve family Lucinidae. London: The Ray Society [Publication 182]. 319 pp.

External links
 Agassiz, L. (1846). Nomenclatoris Zoologici Index Universalis, continens nomina systematica classium, ordinum, familiarum et generum animalium omnium, tam viventium quam fossilium, secundum ordinem alphabeticum unicum disposita, adjectis homonymus plantarum nec non variis adnotationibus et emendationibus. i-x, 1-1135. Soloduri. : Sumptibus Jent et Gassman
 Fischer, P. (1880-1887). Manuel de conchyliologie et de paléontologie conchyliologique, ou histoire naturelle des mollusques vivants et fossiles suivi d'un Appendice sur les Brachiopodes par D. P. Oehlert. Avec 23 planches contenant 600 figures dessinées par S. P. Woodward.. Paris: F. Savy. Published in 11 parts (fascicules), xxiv + 1369 pp., 23 pls.
 Taylor J.D. & Glover E.A. (2016). Lucinid bivalves of Guadeloupe: diversity and systematics in the context of the tropical Western Atlantic (Mollusca: Bivalvia: Lucinidae). Zootaxa. 4196(3): 301-380

Lucinidae
Bivalve genera